Riaz Uddin Ahamed Siddique, better known as Riaz, is a Bangladeshi film actor, producer, and television presenter. Through his career in Bengali films (Dhallywood), Riaz has established himself as one of the most popular actors of Bangladeshi cinema, he has appeared in more than 100 Bengali films in genres ranging from romance to action and comedies. He is the recipient of numerous achievements, including three National Film Awards and seven Meril Prothom Alo Awards.

Riaz first appeared on screen as a side role hero filmmaker Dewan Nazrul's social action drama film Banglar Nayok (1995). He began a full-time career in film with a leading role in the highly successful romantic drama Praner Cheye Priyo (1997). In 2005 Riaz work with Bollywood actress Susmita Sen for Mahesh Manjrekars film It Was Raining That Night. His last released movie "Lobhe Paap Paape Mrittu" release was 14 February 2014, directed by Sohanur Rahman Sohan.

Film career 
Early in his career Riaz played romantic roles in films such as Praner Cheye Priyo and Hridoyer Aina (1997), Kajer Meye, Prithibi Tomar Amar and Bhalobasi Tomake (1998), Biyer Phul and Narir Mon (1999), E Badhon Jabena Chire, Nishwase Tumi Biswase Tumi and Bhownkor Bishu (2000), Hridoyer Bandhon and O Priya Tumi Kothay (2001), Premer Taj Mahal (2002), Moner Majhe Tumi (2003), Wrong Number (2004), Hridoyer Kotha (2006) and Akash Chhoa Bhalobasa (2008).

Riaz has also acted in  literature-based films. He received wide critical acclaim for Dui Duari (2000), Shasti: Punishment, Megher Pore Megh: Clouds After Cloud and Shyamol Chhaya: The Green Shadow (2004), Hajar Bachhor Dhore: Symphony of Agony (2005), Bidrohi Padma and Khelaghar: Dollhouse (2006), Daruchini Dip and Ekjon Songe Chhilo (2007), Megher Koley Rod: Sunshine In The Clouds, Ki Jadu Korila and Chandra Grohon: The Lunar Eclipse (2008), Ebadat: The Worship (2009) and Modhumoti (2011). These roles gave established Riaz as a classical contemporary actor of Bengali cinema.

Filmography

Television

As an actor

Web series

As a host 
 Meril Prothom Alo Awards - 2007 (with Ferdous Ahmed)
 Nirman-er Taraka - 2009-2010 (with Mushfika Tina)
 Nirman-er Taraka (Eid Special) - 2010 (with Mushfika Tina)
 Purti Utsab Tarar Mela - 2011 (with Moushumi)
 National Film Awards 2010 - 2012 (with Moushumi)

See also 
 Dhallywood
 Bangladeshi film actor
 Cinema of Bangladesh

References

External links 

 

Bangladeshi filmographies
Male actor filmographies